Marcus Porcius M. f. M. n. Cato was the father of Cato the Younger.  His promising political career was cut short by his sudden death, early in the first century BC.

Family
Cato was the son of Marcus Porcius Cato Salonianus, the son of Cato the Elder by his second wife, Salonia.  Cato Salonianus was born in 154 BC, and lived to obtain the praetorship, but then died in office, leaving two sons, Marcus and Lucius.  When Marcus was grown, he married Livia, daughter of Marcus Livius Drusus, consul in 112 BC.  Livia had previously been married to Quintus Servilius Caepio, and had three children: Gnaeus, Servilia, who married Marcus Junius Brutus, and Servilia Minor, wife of Lucius Licinius Lucullus.  Since Caepio died during the Social War, he and Livia must have been divorced.  The cause is not known, but it might have been the result of the enmity that developed between Caepio and his brother-in-law, Marcus Livius Drusus, although they had previously been close friends.  Cato and Livia had a son, Marcus, born in 95 BC, and a daughter, Porcia.

Career
Cato was tribune of the plebs in an uncertain year, probably early in the first decade of the first century BC.  Broughton assigns his tribunate to 99 BC, in which year the tribunes Cato and Quintus Pompeius Rufus attempted to recall Quintus Caecilius Metellus Numidicus from exile.  This bill was opposed by Gaius Marius, a prominent general and rival of Numidicus, and with his support the proposal was vetoed by the tribune Publius Furius.  Drumann identifies this Cato as Lucius, the brother of Marcus, but the year of his tribunate is equally uncertain.

Cicero relates an anecdote concerning a decision that Cato gave in a civil trial, relating to a vendor's duty to disclose hidden defects to a purchaser.  A certain Claudius, having been ordered by the augurs to demolish his house on the Caelian Hill, because it obstructed the auspices, sold the house to the plaintiff, Calpurnius, without mentioning the demand of the augurs.  When Calpurnius learned that his house was to be demolished, he brought suit against Claudius for fraud, and Cato rendered a decision in his favour, requiring Claudius to pay him damages.

Death
At the time of his death, which occurred some time before the outbreak of the Social War in 91 BC, Cato was a candidate for the praetorship.  Livia also died while her children were young. They were raised in the household of their uncle, Marcus Livius Drusus.  Both Drusus and Caepio were killed in the Social War, as was Cato's brother, Lucius, during his consulship in 89 BC.  Marcus Cato had been a friend of the general Sulla, who took an interest in his son after Cato's death.  Cato's daughter, Porcia, married Lucius Domitius Ahenobarbus, who became consul in 54 BC.

See also
 Porcia gens

Footnotes

References

Bibliography
 Marcus Tullius Cicero, De Officiis, Epistulae ad Atticum.
 Plutarchus, Lives of the Noble Greeks and Romans.
 Aulus Gellius, Noctes Atticae (Attic Nights).
 Wilhelm Drumann, Geschichte Roms in seinem Übergang von der republikanischen zur monarchischen Verfassung, oder: Pompeius, Caesar, Cicero und ihre Zeitgenossen, Königsberg (1834–1844).
 Dictionary of Greek and Roman Biography and Mythology, William Smith, ed., Little, Brown and Company, Boston (1849).
 T. Robert S. Broughton, The Magistrates of the Roman Republic, American Philological Association (1952).

90s BC deaths
Cato, Marcus
1st-century BC Romans
Cato the Younger